The 2011–12 Topklasse season was the second edition of the Dutch league since its inception in 2010. A total 32 teams competed in the league: 24 from the 2010–11 Topklasse, and the remaining eight from the 2010–11 Hoofdklasse. As usual, the competition was divided into two leagues: "Saturday" and "Sunday", who differ by the day their games are usually played.

For this season, no team was promoted to the Eerste Divisie, due to the fact all league teams declined to apply for that. Promotion to the higher tier for a Topklasse requires it to switch into full professionalism and play on Friday nights instead of either Saturday or Sunday afternoons. The league was won by Sunday champions Achilles '29 from Groesbeek, who defeated Saturday champions SV Spakenburg in a two-legged final (5–0 aggregate).

Teams

Saturday league

Sunday league

League tables

Saturday league

Sunday league

Championship play-offs

Achilles '29 won the overall Topklasse title. As neither them nor runners-up Spakenburg applied for that, no Topklasse team was promoted to 2012–13 Eerste Divisie.

Promotion/relegation play-offs

13th place play-off – Saturday league
Harkemase Boys and SVZW both finished the season with 25 points. So there was an extra match between them to decide who could play relegation playoffs and who had to relegate immediately.

SVZW relegated to 2012–13 Hoofdklasse. Harkemase Boys will play relegation playoffs.

Topklasse / Hoofdklasse playoff semifinals

Topklasse / Hoofdklasse playoff finals

Kozakken Boys promoted to 2012–13 Topklasse Saturday; Chabab promoted to 2012–13 Topklasse Sunday.

References

2011-12
Neth
3